Mali Osolnik is a village northwest of Rašica in the Municipality of Velike Lašče in central Slovenia. The entire municipality is part of the traditional region of Lower Carniola and is now included in the Central Slovenia Statistical Region.

The local church, built outside the settlement to the southwest, is dedicated to Saint James and belongs to the Parish of Škocjan pri Turjaku. It was built in around 1700.

References

External links
Mali Osolnik on Geopedia

Populated places in the Municipality of Velike Lašče